The 1999 World Wushu Championships was the 5th edition of the World Wushu Championships. It was held at the Hong Kong Coliseum in Hong Kong, from November 2 to November 7, 1999.

Medal summary

Medal table

Men's taolu

Men's sanda

Women's taolu

References 



World Wushu Championships
Wushu Championships
World Wushu Championships, 1999
1999 in wushu (sport)
Wushu in Hong Kong